The French Conjuror is a comedy play by the English writer Thomas Porter. It was first staged by the Duke's Company at the Dorset Garden Theatre in London in June 1677.

The original cast included Thomas Jevon as Avarito, John Crosby as Claudio, Thomas Gillow as Dorido, Henry Norris as Horatio, Thomas Percival as Truro, Anthony Leigh as Monsieur, John Richards as Audacio, Elizabeth Barry as Clorinia, Margaret Hughes as Leonora and Elinor Leigh as Scintilla.

References

Bibliography
 Van Lennep, W. The London Stage, 1660-1800: Volume One, 1660-1700. Southern Illinois University Press, 1960.

1677 plays
West End plays
Plays by Thomas Porter
Restoration comedy